The 1997 Paris Saint-Germain rugby league season was the club's second season in the Super League. PSG competed in Super League II and finished in 11th place. The club folded at the end of the season.

Table

Squad

References

External links
Paris St Germain - Rugby League Project

Paris Saint-Germain
Paris Saint-Germain Rugby League
French rugby league club seasons